Perwaghagh Falls is a waterfall with clear water flow on Chata River in the  Fatka panchayat of Torpa block in Khunti district in the Indian state of Jharkhand.

Etymology 
The word “perwa” means pigeon and “ghagh“ means home which depicts the “House of Pigeons” inside the waterfall. Many still believe that these pigeons live inside the waterfall.

Geography

Location 

It is located 40 km from Khunti. The road to the falls is through a forested area with a glimpse of hills. However, the visitor has to walk some distance to reach the falls, because of the rough terrain.

Area overview 
In the adjacent map the area shown is “undulating and covered with hills, hillocks and jungles (jungles/ forests are shown as shaded area in the map). The soil of the area is rocky, sandy and red loam upland. There are paddy fields only in the depressions. In 2011, it had a density of population of 210 persons per sq km. Khunti is an overwhelmingly rural district with 91.5% of the population living in rural areas. Famous places in this area are Ulihatu, the birth place of Bhagwan Birsa Munda, and Dombari Buru, the central point of his activity. 

Note: The map alongside presents some of the notable locations in the district. All places marked in the map are linked in the larger full screen map.

Picnic spot 
Endowed with scenic surroundings, Perwaghagh Falls is a popular picnic spot. Small row boats are available for joy rides around the place.

See also 
List of waterfalls in India 
List of waterfalls in India by height

References 
 

 

 

Waterfalls of Jharkhand